The Republic of Ireland national under-17 football team, is the national under-17 football team of the Republic of Ireland and is controlled by the Football Association of Ireland and competes in the annual UEFA European Under-17 Championship and the biennial FIFA U-17 World Cup.

History
The Republic of Ireland won the 1998 UEFA European Under-16 Championship in Scotland and the 1998 UEFA European Under-18 Championship.

Competitive record

FIFA Under-17 World Cup
The team has never qualified for the FIFA Under-17 World Cup (formerly the FIFA Under-17 World Championship and FIFA Under-16 World Championship), and did not enter the 1985 edition.

UEFA European Under-17 Championship
The Republic of Ireland Under-17s have qualified for the UEFA European Under-17 Championship (formerly the UEFA European Under-16 Championship) 11 times, winning the competition in 1998. They hosted the 1994 and 2019 editions and finished in the group stage for both.

Results and fixtures

2021

2022

Honours
 UEFA European Under-17 Championship, formerly UEFA European Under-16 Championship
 Champions (1998)

Current squad
 The following players were called up for the 2023 UEFA European Under-17 Championship qualification matches.
 Match dates: 20–26 October 2022
 Opposition: ,  and 
Caps and goals correct as of: 23 September 2022, after the match against

See also
 UEFA European Under-17 Football Championship
 FIFA U-17 World Cup
 Republic of Ireland (senior) team
 Republic of Ireland national under-21 football team
 Republic of Ireland national under-19 football team

References

External links
 UEFA Under-17 website

Under-17
Ireland
Youth association football in the Republic of Ireland